The East Main Street–Glen Miller Park Historic District is a neighborhood of historic residential buildings and national historic district located at Richmond, Wayne County, Indiana. The district encompasses 84 contributing buildings, 11 contributing structures, and 5 contributing objects along the National Road (US 40) and sometimes called Millionaire's Row.  A portion of the district is recognized by the City of Richmond's Historic Preservation Commission as the Linden Hill conservation district.  It developed between about 1830 and 1937 and includes representative examples of Italianate, Queen Anne, Colonial Revival, Tudor Revival, Classical Revival, and Bungalow / American Craftsman style architecture. Located in the district is the separately listed Henry and Alice Gennett House.  Other notable contributing resources include elaborate iron bridges (c. 1895) and "Madonna of the Trail" statue located in Glen Miller Park, Isham Sedgwick House (1884-1885), John A. Hasecoster House (1895), William H. Campbell House (1905), Howard Campbell House (1909), E.G. Hill House (c. 1880, c. 1900), Crain Sanitarium (c. 1900), and Dr. T. Henry Davis House (c. 1902).

Homes included in the district are those of Henry and Alice Gennett and architect John A. Hasecoster.

Glen Miller Park was named for Colonel John Miller, the original owner of the land, and glen, the type of terrain found there.

The district was added to the National Register of Historic Places in 1986.

See also 

 Old Richmond Historic District
 Starr Historic District
 Richmond Railroad Station Historic District
 Reeveston Place Historic District
 Richmond Downtown Historic District

External links
 District photos and information from Waynet.org

References

Historic districts on the National Register of Historic Places in Indiana
Italianate architecture in Indiana
Queen Anne architecture in Indiana
Colonial Revival architecture in Indiana
Tudor Revival architecture in Indiana
Neoclassical architecture in Indiana
Bungalow architecture in Indiana
Historic districts in Richmond, Indiana
National Register of Historic Places in Wayne County, Indiana